Holy City is a hamlet in the parish of Chardstock, East Devon, England.

References 

Villages in Devon